Methicula dimidiata is a species of beetle in the family Cerambycidae, the only species in the genus Methicula.

References

Xystrocerini
Monotypic beetle genera